Rotgipfler is a grape variety used to make aromatic white wine. It is almost exclusively found in the Gumpoldskirchen district of the Thermenregion in Austria. It is often blended with Zierfandler (which is also known as Spätrot) to make Spätrot-Rotgipfler. It is also increasingly used for quality wines. Such Rotgipfler wines are powerful, high in alcohol and suitable for cellaring.

Rotgipfler has been named for the red tips of its vine leaves. The earliest known mention of Rotgipfler was in 1837 in Steiermark by Johann Burger. Rotgipfler has been identified as a cross between Traminer and Roter Veltliner.

See also
 Austrian wine

References

White wine grape varieties
Austrian wine